Kameshwar Barma is a Padma Shri awarded person. Born on 1 September 1940  in the Kokrajhar district of the north Indian state of Assam, he is reported to have contributed to the development of Bodo language through his writings and activities. He is also involved with different NGOs and the good will  activities of different tribal peoples. The government Of India awards him fourth highest civilian award Padma Shri He served at different positions .

He was awarded the 2020 Sahitya Akademi Translation Prize for his translation Gibi Bharatni Jerimin.

See also 
 Bodo Sahitya Sabha
 Bineswar Brahma

References

1940 births
Living people
Recipients of the Padma Shri in literature & education
Recipients of the Sahitya Akademi Prize for Translation